SremmLife is the debut studio album by American hip hop duo Rae Sremmurd. It was released on January 6, 2015, by Ear Drummer Records and Interscope Records. The album was supported by five singles: "No Flex Zone", "No Type", "Throw Sum Mo" featuring Nicki Minaj and Young Thug, "This Could Be Us" and "Come Get Her".

Background
Rae Sremmurd is a Mississippi-born hip hop duo composed of Swae Lee and Slim Jxmmi. In 2014, the duo signed a recording contract with American music producer Mike Will Made It's newly found label, the Interscope Records imprint, EarDrummers Entertainment.

Singles
The duo's debut single from the album, called "No Flex Zone" was released via digital download on May 18, 2014. The song was produced by Mike Will Made It, and co-produced by A+. The song gained media attention after the release of the remix, which features guest vocals from rappers Nicki Minaj and Pusha T. The song peaked at number 36 on the US Billboard Hot 100.

The album's second single, called "No Type" was released on September 15, 2014. Producer Mike WiLL Made-It also serves the production on this track, along with Swae Lee. The song peaked at number 16 on the US Billboard Hot 100. It was the number 70 song of the 2015 year-end chart.

The album's third single, called "Throw Sum Mo" was released on December 9, 2014. The song features guest vocals from these fellow American hip hop recording artists Nicki Minaj and Young Thug, with the production that was handled by Soundz and Mike WiLL Made-It. The song peaked at number 30 on the US Billboard Hot 100.

The album's fourth single, "This Could Be Us" was sent to US urban adult contemporary radio on April 21, 2015. The song's production was handled by Mike WiLL Made-It. The song peaked at number 49 on the US Billboard Hot 100.

The album's fifth single, "Come Get Her" was sent to US rhythmic radio on September 29, 2015. The song was produced by Mike WiLL Made-It, and co-produced by A+. The song peaked at number 56 on the US Billboard Hot 100.

Critical reception

SremmLife received generally positive reviews from music critics. At Metacritic, which assigns a normalized rating out of 100 to reviews from critics, the album received an average score of 78, which indicates "generally favorable reviews", based on 15 reviews. Writing for Exclaim!, Eric Zaworski concluded that "SremmLife sounds like how cheap vodka works — it burns a little, yeah, but it gets you there," explaining that the record "only further reinforces the vice grip hip-hop from south of the Mason-Dixon has on the mainstream." Justin Charity of Complex said "the chants and ecstatic poetry of SremmLife are fully charged from start to finish."

Year-end lists

All time lists

Commercial performance
SremmLife debuted at number 5 on the US Billboard 200, with 49,000 equivalent album units; it sold 34,000 copies in its first week, with the remainder of its unit count reflecting streaming activity and track sales. In its second week, the album declined to number 17 with 23,000 units, including an additional 11,000 copies sold. It has remained on the album chart for 19 weeks thus far. As of June 2016, SremmLife has sold 198,000 copies domestically. With streaming and physical sales, the album has since gone Platinum and all of its singles have gone 2× Platinum or higher, with the promotional single "Up Like Trump" being certified Gold.

Track listing 

Notes
 signifies a co-producer.
 "This Could Be Us" features additional vocals by Jace of Two-9.

Sample credits
"This Could Be Us" contains a sample from "Burnin' Love" performed by Black Grass.

Personnel
Credits adapted from the album booklet and Allmusic.

Performance

Rae Sremmurd – primary artists
Sean "Big Sean" Anderson – featured artist 
Jason "Jace" Harris – featured artist , additional vocals 
Onika "Nicki Minaj" Maraj – featured artist 
Jeffery "Young Thug" Williams – featured artist 

Producers

Michael "Mike Will Made-It" Williams – executive producer, producer 
Pierre "P-Nazty" Slaughter – executive producer
Rae Sremmurd – executive producers
Jeremy "BackPack" Miller – producer 
Carlton "Honorable C.N.O.T.E." Mays – producer 
Sonny "Sonny Digital" Uwaeauoke – producer 
Kenneth "Soundz" Coby – producer 
Tyree "Young Chop" Pitman – producer 
Asheton "A+" Hogan – co-producer 
Marquel "Marz" Middlebrooks – co-producer 
Khalif "Swae Lee" Brown – co-producer 

Technical

Todd Bergman – recording assistant 
Maddox Chhim – mixing assistant 
Aubry "Big Juice" Delaine – engineer 
Stephen Hybicki – engineer , mixing 
Maximilian Jaeger – engineer  
Jaycen Joshua – mixing 
Dave Kutch – mastering 
Ryan Kaul – mixing assistant 
Randy Lanphear – engineer 
Marquel "Marz" Middlebrooks – engineer 
Cody Seal – engineer 
Pierre "P-Nazty" Slaughter – engineer 
Gregg Rominiecki – engineer 
Hakeem Wallace – engineer 
Michael "Mike Will Made-It" Williams – mixing 

Miscellaneous

Ray Alba – publicity
Chelsea Blythe – A&R coordinator
Archie Davis – marketing
Khalfani "Fani" Dennis – stylist
DJ Mormile – management
Todd Douglas – business affairs
Jeremey "Migo The Plug" Ellis – management
Dan Friedman – management
Auro Harewood – digital
Max "Directed By Max" Hliva – videography
Stephanie Hsu – creative
Tracy Kies – business affairs
Justine Massa – creative
Chris Mortimer – digital
Aubrey "Aubz" Potter – style, merchandise
Gunner Safron – marketing
Pierre "P-Nazty" Slaughter – A&R
Manny Smith – A&R
Justin "JusDesignz" Thomas – graphic designer, cover art
Diwang Valdez – photography
Brian "Bwrightous" Wright – marketing, creative director

Charts

Weekly charts

Year-end charts

Certifications

References 

2015 debut albums
Rae Sremmurd albums
Southern hip hop albums
Hip hop albums by American artists
Interscope Records albums
Albums produced by Honorable C.N.O.T.E.
Albums produced by Mike Will Made It